Oil Gobblers is a 1988  Czech mockumentary directed by Jan Svěrák. It is about a zoologist and a biochemist who venture into an oilfield with a cameraman and filmmaker to observe and study the elusive oil gobblers.

References

External links
 

1988 films
Czechoslovak comedy films
1988 comedy films
Films directed by Jan Svěrák
Czech comedy films
1980s Czech-language films
1980s Czech films